George Raymond Lawrence (February 24, 1868 – December 15, 1938) was an American commercial photographer of northern Illinois. After years of experience building kites and balloons for aerial panoramic photography, Lawrence turned to aviation design in 1910.

Life
The Lawrences are descended from John Philip Lorenz, who had emigrated from Germany in 1748. George was born in Ottawa, Illinois, on February 24, 1868. He was the eldest of six children of Margaret Othelia Tritley and Michael B. Lawrence. Michael was a LaSalle County farmer and a carpenter. Within a few years, the family moved sixty miles east to a Kankakee County farm. George went to school through the eighth-grade in the nearby town of Manteno, Illinois. He also attended St. Joseph's Roman Catholic Church in Manteno.

Around 1890, he moved to Chicago and began working at the Abbott Buggy Co. factory in Auburn, Illinois. There, he invented a method of attaching iron rims on wooden wheels. In 1890, Lawrence married Alice Herenden and they had two children: Raymond W. Lawrence and George Lee Lawrence. In 1891, he opened The Lawrence Portrait Studio at the corner of Yale Avenue and 63rd Street, sharing the space and expenses with fellow photographer Irwin W. Powell.

In the mid-1890s, Lawrence perfected the use of "flashlight photography", which was the norm until flashbulbs were invented years later. In 1900, he built the world's largest camera to take a photograph of the Alton Limited Train, owned by the Chicago & Alton Railway. The camera weighed 1400 pounds (640 kg) and used a 4.5′ × 8′ glass-plate negative. The photograph was taken for the 1900 Exposition Universelle (Paris Exposition of 1900) in Paris, France and won "The Grand Prize of the World". He also made innovations in areas of aerial photography such as ballooning and camera–carrying kites.

San Francisco photo

One of Lawrence's world-renowned photographs is of the ruins of San Francisco, California after the 1906 earthquake. It is a 160-degree panorama from a kite taken 2000 feet (600 m) in the air above the San Francisco Bay that showed the entire city on a single 17-by-48-inch contact print made from a single piece of film. Each print sold for $125 and Lawrence made at least $15,000  (US$  in ) in sales from this one photograph. The camera used in this photograph weighed 49 pounds (22 kg) and used a celluloid-film plate.

In 2006, Juneau-based photographer Ronald Klein built a working replica of Lawrence's camera and used it to rephotograph San Francisco from about the same location (but from a helicopter, not a kite), 100 years after the earthquake.  The rephotograph was actually taken by Mark Walsh, George R. Lawrence's great grandson, who rode in the helicopter, held the camera, and clicked the shutter.

Marriage, remarriage, and death

In 1909, while he was away on an expensive and frustrating adventure attempting to take aerial photographs of wild animals in British East Africa, his wife found that he had been having an affair with one of his secretaries. Upon his return, he fled to California, taking his sons with him. He then turned from photography to aviation, building an aircraft at a factory in Chicago. He would be granted nearly a hundred patents for aviation-related devices.

He divorced his first wife, Alice Herendeen, in 1913 (with whom he had had two children, Raymond Welcome Lawrence and George Lee Lawrence), and married Adele Frances "Della" Page in 1916. She was born in St. Louis, Missouri and was the daughter of Henry J. Page, an architect. George Lawrence was 48 years old and Della was 22 years old when they married. They had four daughters: Clara Antoinette, Virginia Lee, Ruth Adele, and Martha "Louise" Lawrence.

Lawrence's aircraft company folded in 1919. He died in 1938, aged 70, and funeral services were held at St. Gertrude's Roman Catholic Church in Chicago. He was buried at St. Joseph's Cemetery in Manteno, Illinois.

Timeline
 1900 Photograph Chicago & Alton Railway's Alton Limited Train
 1906 San Francisco, California earthquake ruins
 1908 Reconstruction pictures of San Francisco, California

References

External links

 
 
 Yesterday's News blog 1901 newspaper account of Lawrence's plan to shoot panoramic photos for the Minneapolis Tribune

1868 births
1938 deaths
American photographers
American people of German descent
Artists from Chicago
People from Kankakee, Illinois
People from Ottawa, Illinois
Commercial photographers
Aerial photographers
People from Manteno, Illinois
Catholics from Illinois